Dorothy Karp Kripke (February 6, 1912 – September 6, 2000) was an American author of Jewish educational books.

Early life 
Kripke, born Dorothy Karp on February 6, 1912  in New York City, was the daughter of Max Samuel Karp, a Rabbi, and Goldie Karp (née Mereminsky).

In 1937 she married Rabbi Myer S. Kripke at the Jewish Theological Seminary in New York City. They had three children, Saul, Madeline, and Netta.

Kripke died on September 6, 2000, in Omaha, after a long illness.

Career 
Kripke was a Jewish Theological Seminary graduate, Rebbetzin (Rabbanit) and children's book author, and is the mother of noted philosopher Saul A. Kripke. Some of her books were illustrated by Vladimir Bobri.

Philanthropy 
The Kripkes made the decision to become active in philanthropy after a series of successful investments left them in a position where they were able to donate large sums to worthwhile causes.

Works or publications 
 Kripke, Dorothy K, and Aimee Neibart. Let's Talk About Being Jewish. New York: Ktav, 1952 [1981].
 Kripke, Dorothy K, and Jessie B. Robinson. Rhymes to Pray. New York: Bloch Pub. Co, 1952.
 Kripke, Dorothy K, and Vladimir Bobri. Let's Talk About God. New York: Behrman House, 1953.
 Kripke, Dorothy K, and Christine Tripp. Let's Talk About God. Los Angeles, CA: Alef Design Group, 2003.  (2003 reprint of 1953 book with illustrations by Christine Tripp)
 Kripke, Dorothy K. Let's Talk About Right and Wrong. New York: Behrman House, 1955.
 Kripke, Dorothy K. Let's Talk About Judaism. New York: Behrman House, 1957.
 Kripke, Dorothy K. Debbie in Dreamland: Her Holiday Adventures. New York: National Women's league of the United Synagogue of America, 1960.
 Kripke, Dorothy K, Meyer Levin, Stephen Kraft, and Lorence F. Bjorkland. God and the Story of Judaism. New York: Behrman House, 1962.
 Kripke, Dorothy K. Let's Talk About the Jewish Holidays. New York: Jonathan David, 1970.
 Kripke, Dorothy K, Myer S. Kripke, and Laszlo Matulay. Let's Talk About Loving: About Love, Sex, Marriage, and Family. New York: Ktav Pub. House, 1980. 
 Kripke, Dorothy K, Stacy Crossland, and Joy N. Wieder. Let's Talk About the Sabbath. Los Angeles, Calif: Alef Design Group, 1999. 
 Kripke, Dorothy K. Children's Books and Stories About American Jewish Life and History: A Bibliography. New York: American Jewish Historical Society.

See also 
 Myer S. Kripke
 Saul A. Kripke
 Jews in Omaha, Nebraska

Notes and references 

1912 births
2000 deaths
American Conservative Jews
American education writers
American family and parenting writers
American spiritual writers
Burials at Beth El Cemetery (Ralston, Nebraska)
Jewish American writers
Jewish Theological Seminary of America alumni
Jewish women writers
Dorothy
Writers from Omaha, Nebraska
Writers from New York City
20th-century American non-fiction writers
20th-century American women writers
20th-century American Jews